Sovetabad, Nakhchivan may refer to:
 Sovetabad, Babek
 Arpaçay, Azerbaijan